Roger Simon may refer to:

 Roger Simon, 2nd Baron Simon of Wythenshawe (1913-2002), solicitor and left wing journalist and political activist
 Roger L. Simon (born 1943), screenwriter and novelist, and co-founder of PJ Media
 Roger Simon (journalist), columnist and political writer